The Circuito Norte (CN), meaning "Northern Circuit", is a west-east highway spanning the length of the island of Cuba, through the Atlantic Coast. With a length of 1,222 km, it is the second-longest Cuban highway, after the "Carretera Central"; and two sections of it, named "Vía Blanca" and "Panamericana", are classified as Expressways.

Route

Description

The CN starts in Mantua, in the west of Pinar del Río Province and, through the northern side of the island, crosses the provinces of Artemisa, Havana, Mayabeque, Matanzas, Villa Clara, Sancti Spíritus, Ciego de Ávila, Camagüey, Las Tunas and Holguín; until its end in Baracoa, Guantánamo Province, in which it shares the eastern endpoint of the Carretera Central. The motorway sections link Mariel to western Havana (the Panamericana), and eastern Havana to Cárdenas (Vía Blanca).

Table
The table below shows the route of the Circuito Norte. Note: Provincial seats are shown in bold; the names shown under brackets in the section "Municipality" indicate the municipal seats; the symbol  indicates the motorway section.

See also

Roads in Cuba
Circuito Sur

References

External links

Roads in Cuba
Pinar del Río Province
Artemisa Province
Transport in Havana
Mayabeque Province
Matanzas Province
Villa Clara Province
Sancti Spíritus Province
Ciego de Ávila Province
Camagüey Province
Las Tunas Province
Holguín Province
Guantánamo Province